The 2018–19 Cleveland Cavaliers season was the 49th season of the franchise in the National Basketball Association (NBA). The Cavaliers entered the season as runners-up in the 2018 NBA Finals, in which they were swept by the Golden State Warriors in four games, the first Finals sweep since 2007, in which the Cavs were also swept, by the San Antonio Spurs. The Cavaliers had the worst team defensive rating in the NBA.

LeBron James was not on the roster for the first time since 2014-15, as he signed with the Los Angeles Lakers in the offseason as a free agent.

On October 28, 2018, the Cavaliers fired Tyronn Lue after a 0–6 start (the worst start for a team coming off the NBA Finals) and replaced him on the interim basis with his assistant Larry Drew, who would become permanent coach on November 5.

Without LeBron James, as with the 2010–11 season (James' first departure from Cleveland), the Cavaliers struggled to find a solid identity, ranking in the bottom 10 in all of points per game, opponent points per game, pace, offensive rating, and defensive rating. They finished at 19–63, the third worst record in the league, second worst in the Eastern Conference, and their worst season since 2010–11. This was also the Cavs' first losing season since the 2013–14 season.

Draft

The Cavaliers entered the 2018 NBA draft with the rights to the eighth overall pick, which originally belonged to the Brooklyn Nets. Cleveland acquired the pick from the Boston Celtics in the Kyrie Irving trade during the summer of 2017. The Cavaliers used the pick to acquire point guard Collin Sexton, a freshman out of the University of Alabama.

Preseason summary 
On July 1, 2018, LeBron James confirmed that he would be leaving the Cavaliers and signing a four-year, $154 million contract with the Los Angeles Lakers. This marked the second time in which James left the Cavaliers in free agency, with the first coming when James joined the Miami Heat in 2010.

Roster

<noinclude>

Standings

Division

Conference

Game log

Preseason 

|- style="background:#cfc;"
| 1
| October 2
| @ Boston
| 
| Kevin Love (17)
| Osman, Nance Jr. (7)
| Cedi Osman (4)
| TD Garden18,624
| 1–0
|- style="background:#cfc;"
| 2
| October 6
| Boston
| 
| Ante Zizic (20)
| Osman, Clarkson (6)
| Taylor, Osman, Clarkson (3)
| Quicken Loans Arena17,083
| 2–0
|- style="background:#fcc;"
| 3
| October 8
| Indiana
| 
| Kyle Korver (17)
| Thompson, Nance Jr. (7)
| George Hill (5)
| Quicken Loans Arena16,330
| 2–1
|- style="background:#fcc;"
| 4
| October 12
| Detroit
| 
| Rodney Hood (21)
| Tristan Thompson (9)
| Collin Sexton (5)
| Breslin Student Events Center7,517
| 2–2

Regular season 

|- style="background:#fcc
| 1
| October 17
| @ Toronto
| 
| Kevin Love (21)
| Tristan Thompson (13)
| George Hill (7)
| Scotiabank Arena19,915
| 0–1
|- style="background:#fcc
| 2
| October 19
| @ Minnesota
| 
| Kevin Love (25)
| Kevin Love (19)
| Cedi Osman (8)
| Target Center18,978
| 0–2
|-style="background:#fcc
| 3
| October 21
| Atlanta
| 
| Jordan Clarkson (19)
| Kevin Love (17)
| Cedi Osman (4)
| Quicken Loans Arena19,432
| 0–3
|- style="background:#fcc
| 4
| October 24
| Brooklyn
| 
| Love, Sexton, Clarkson (14)
| Tristan Thompson (12)
| Thompson, Nance Jr. (4)
| Quicken Loans Arena19,432
| 0–4
|- style="background:#fcc
| 5
| October 25
| @ Detroit
| 
| Kyle Korver (21)
| Osman, Nance Jr. (6)
| Sexton, Nance Jr. (5)
| Little Caesars Arena15,896
| 0–5
|- style="background:#fcc
| 6
| October 27
| Indiana
| 
| Rodney Hood (17)
| Larry Nance Jr. (12)
| Sexton, Nance Jr. (4)
| Quicken Loans Arena19,432
| 0–6
|- style="background:#cfc
| 7
| October 30
| Atlanta
| 
| Rodney Hood (26)
| Tristan Thompson (13)
| Sam Dekker (4)
| Quicken Loans Arena19,432
| 1–6

|- style="background:#fcc
| 8
| November 1
| Denver
| 
| Jordan Clarkson (17)
| Tristan Thompson (7)
| Thompson, Hood (4)
| Quicken Loans Arena19,432
| 1–7
|- style="background:#fcc
| 9
| November 3
| @ Charlotte
| 
| J.R. Smith (14)
| Tristan Thompson (8)
| Hill, Smith, Korver (4)
| Spectrum Center16,221
| 1–8
|- style="background:#fcc
| 10
| November 5
| @ Orlando
| 
| George Hill (22)
| Tristan Thompson (16)
| George Hill (6)
| Amway Center15,009
| 1–9
|-style="background:#fcc
| 11
| November 7
| Oklahoma City
| 
| Collin Sexton (15)
| Tristan Thompson (15)
| Jordan Clarkson (8)
| Quicken Loans Arena19,432
| 1–10
|- style="background:#fcc
| 12
| November 10
| @ Chicago
| 
| Tristan Thompson (22)
| Larry Nance Jr. (14)
| Jordan Clarkson (4)
| United Center21,506
| 1–11
|-style="background:#cfc
| 13
| November 13
| Charlotte
| 
| Jordan Clarkson (24)
| Tristan Thompson (21)
| Smith, Thompson (5)
| Quicken Loans Arena19,432
| 2–11
|-style="background:#fcc
| 14
| November 14
| @ Washington
| 
| Collin Sexton (24)
| David Nwaba (7)
| Larry Nance Jr. (5)
| Capital One Arena14,537
| 2–12
|- style="background:#fcc
| 15
| November 19
| @ Detroit
| 
| Collin Sexton (18)
| Tristan Thompson (7)
| Sexton, Clarkson (4)
| Little Caesars Arena15,769
| 2–13
|- style="background:#fcc
| 16
| November 21
| LA Lakers
| 
| Cedi Osman (21)
| Tristan Thompson (15)
| Clarkson, Nance Jr. (5)
| Quicken Loans Arena19,432
| 2–14
|- style="background:#cfc
| 17
| November 23
| @ Philadelphia
| 
| Rodney Hood (25)
| Tristan Thompson (13)
| Andrew Harrison (5)
| Wells Fargo Center20,524
| 3–14
|- style="background:#cfc
| 18
| November 24
| Houston
| 
| Collin Sexton (29)
| Tristan Thompson (20)
| Jordan Clarkson (4)
| Quicken Loans Arena19,432
| 4–14
|- style="background:#fcc
| 19
| November 26
| Minnesota
| 
| Kyle Korver (22)
| Tristan Thompson (11)
| Larry Nance Jr. (7)
| Quicken Loans Arena19,432
| 4–15
|- style="background:#fcc
| 20
| November 28
| @ Oklahoma City
| 
| Collin Sexton (21)
| Nance Jr., Osman, Sexton (10)
| Cedi Osman (6)
| Chesapeake Energy Arena18,203
| 4–16
|- style="background:#fcc
| 21
| November 30
| @ Boston
| 
| Jordan Clarkson (16)
| Tristan Thompson (12)
| Burks, Thompson, Sexton (4)
| TD Garden18,624
| 4–17

|- style="background:#fcc
| 22
| December 1
| Toronto
| 
| Clarkson, Thompson (18)
| Tristan Thompson (19)
| Osman, Thompson (3)
| Quicken Loans Arena19,432
| 4–18
|- style="background:#cfc
| 23
| December 3
| @ Brooklyn
| 
| Jordan Clarkson (20)
| Tristan Thompson (14)
| Jordan Clarkson (4)
| Barclays Center10,983
| 5–18
|- style="background:#fcc;"
| 24
| December 5
| Golden State
| 
| Collin Sexton (21)
| Tristan Thompson (19)
| Hill, Thompson, Clarkson, Sexton (3)
| Quicken Loans Arena19,432
| 5–19
|- style="background:#fcc;"
| 25
| December 7
| Sacramento
| 
| Jordan Clarkson (26)
| Burks, Nance Jr. (7)
| Alec Burks (9)
| Quicken Loans Arena19,432
| 5–20
|- style="background:#cfc;"
| 26
| December 8
| Washington
| 
| Collin Sexton (29)
| Tristan Thompson (19)
| Larry Nance Jr. (7)
| Quicken Loans Arena19,432
| 6–20
|- style="background:#fcc;"
| 27 
| December 10
| @ Milwaukee
| 
| Larry Nance Jr. (16)
| Jaron Blossomgame (10)
| Cedi Osman (6)
| Fiserv Forum17,155
| 6–21
|- style="background:#cfc;
| 28
| December 12
| NY Knicks
| 
| Jordan Clarkson (28)
| Larry Nance Jr. (11)
| Larry Nance Jr. (7)
| Quicken Loans Arena19,432
| 7–21
|- style="background:#fcc
| 29
| December 14
| Milwaukee
| 
| Jordan Clarkson (23)
| Larry Nance Jr. (10)
| Larry Nance Jr. (6)
| Quicken Loans Arena19,432
| 7–22
|- style="background:#fcc
| 30
| December 16
| Philadelphia
| 
| Osman, Clarkson (18)
| Jordan Clarkson (6)
| Matthew Dellavedova (7)
| Quicken Loans Arena19,432
| 7–23
|- style="background:#cfc
| 31
| December 18 
| @ Indiana
| 
| Rodney Hood (17)
| Larry Nance Jr. (16)
| Larry Nance Jr. (6)
| Bankers Life Fieldhouse15,630
| 8–23
|- style="background:#fcc
| 32
| December 19
| @ Charlotte
| 
| Jordan Clarkson (20)
| Larry Nance Jr. (15)
| Larry Nance Jr. (7)
| Spectrum Center15,179
| 8–24
|- style="background:#fcc
| 33
| December 21
| @ Toronto
| 
| Jordan Clarkson (20)
| Larry Nance Jr. (12)
| Matthew Dellavedova (7)
| Scotiabank Arena19,800
| 8–25
|- style="background:#fcc
| 34
| December 23
| Chicago
| 
| Larry Nance Jr. (20)
| Cedi Osman (7)
| Burks, Sexton (3)
| Quicken Loans Arena19,432
| 8–26
|- style="background:#fcc
| 35
| December 26
| @ Memphis
| 
| Jordan Clarkson (24)
| Ante Zizic (11)
| Collin Sexton (6)
| FedExForum16,424
| 8–27
|- style="background:#fcc
| 36
| December 28
| @ Miami
| 
| Jordan Clarkson (18)
| Jaron Blossomgame (10)
| Alec Burks (5)
| American Airlines Arena19,617
| 8–28
|- style="background:#fcc
| 37
| December 29
| @ Atlanta
| 
| Cedi Osman (22)
| Larry Nance Jr. (15)
| Larry Nance Jr. (7)
| State Farm Arena16,460
| 8–29

|- style="background:#fcc
| 38
| January 2
| Miami
| 
| Tristan Thompson (14)
| Larry Nance Jr. (5)
| Larry Nance Jr. (6)
| Quicken Loans Arena19,432
| 8–30
|- style="background:#fcc
| 39 
| January 4
| Utah
| 
| Alec Burks (17)
| Tristan Thompson (12)
| Frye, Sexton (3)
| Quicken Loans Arena19,432
| 8–31
|- style="background:#fcc
| 40
| January 5
| New Orleans
| 
| Jordan Clarkson (23)
| Tristan Thompson (11)
| Alec Burks (6)
| Quicken Loans Arena19,432
| 8–32
|- style="background:#fcc
| 41
| January 8
| Indiana
| 
| Jordan Clarkson (26)
| Tristan Thompson (13)
| Thompson, Dellavedova (5)
| Quicken Loans Arena19,432
| 8–33
|- style="background:#fcc
| 42
| January 9
| @ New Orleans
| 
| Jordan Clarkson (21)
| Tristan Thompson (10)
| Matthew Dellavedova (7)
| Smoothie King Center15,058
| 8–34
|- style="background:#fcc
| 43
| January 11
| @ Houston
| 
| Ante Zizic (18)
| Ante Zizic (8)
| Payne, Sexton (5)
| Toyota Center18,055
| 8–35
|- style="background:#cfc
| 44
| January 13
| @ LA Lakers
| 
| Cedi Osman (20)
| Tristan Thompson (14)
| Alec Burks (4)
| Staples Center18,997
| 9–35
|- style="background:#fcc
| 45
| January 16
| @ Portland
| 
| Jordan Clarkson (22)
| Jaron Blossomgame (10)
| Matthew Dellavedova (6)
| Moda Center19,089
| 9–36
|- style="background:#fcc
| 46
| January 18
| @ Utah
| 
| Zizic, Sexton (15)
| Ante Zizic (10)
| Dellavedova, Payne (3)
| Vivint Smart Home Arena18,306
| 9–37
|- style="background:#fcc
| 47
| January 19
| @ Denver
| 
| Ante Zizic (23)
| Ante Zizic (6)
| Collin Sexton (7)
| Pepsi Center19,520
| 9–38
|- style="background:#fcc
| 48
| January 21
| Chicago
| 
| Collin Sexton (18)
| Ante Zizic (9)
| Jordan Clarkson (4)
| Quicken Loans Arena19,432
| 9–39
|- style="background:#fcc
| 49
| January 23
| @ Boston
| 
| Cedi Osman (25)
| Alec Burks (9)
| Alec Burks (6)
| TD Garden18,624
| 9–40
|- style="background:#fcc
| 50
| January 25
| Miami
| 
| Cedi Osman (29)
| Ante Zizic (9)
| Matthew Dellavedova (5)
| Quicken Loans Arena19,432
| 9–41
|- style="background:#cfc
| 51
| January 27
| @ Chicago
| 
| Clarkson, Burks (18)
| Ante Zizic (14)
| Jordan Clarkson (6)
| United Center19,675
| 10–41
|- style="background:#cfc
| 52
| January 29
| Washington
| 
| Cedi Osman (26)
| Ante Zizic (12)
| Alec Burks (9)
| Quicken Loans Arena19,432
| 11–41

|- style="background:#fcc
| 53
| February 2
| Dallas
| 
| Jordan Clarkson (19)
| Larry Nance Jr. (12)
| Alec Burks (5)
| Quicken Loans Arena19,432
| 11–42
|- style="background:#fcc
| 54
| February 5
| Boston
| 
| Collin Sexton (25)
| Zizic, Nance Jr. (12)
| Matthew Dellavedova (4)
| Quicken Loans Arena19,432
| 11–43
|- style="background:#fcc
| 55
| February 8
| @ Washington
| 
| Collin Sexton (27)
| Larry Nance Jr. (19)
| Larry Nance Jr. (6)
| Capital One Arena16,682
| 11–44
|- style="background:#fcc
| 56
| February 9
| @ Indiana
| 
| Jordan Clarkson (18)
| Larry Nance Jr. (10)
| Jordan Clarkson (6)
| Bankers Life Fieldhouse17,923
| 11–45
|- style="background:#cfc
| 57
| February 11
| NY Knicks
| 
| Collin Sexton (20)
| Larry Nance Jr. (16)
| Matthew Dellavedova (6)
| Quicken Loans Arena19,432
| 12–45
|- style="background:#fcc
| 58
| February 13
| Brooklyn
| 
| Jordan Clarkson (42)
| Larry Nance Jr. (14)
| Matthew Dellavedova (13)
| Quicken Loans Arena17,434
| 12–46
|- style="background:#cfc
| 59
| February 21
| Phoenix
| 
| Cedi Osman (19)
| Ante Zizic (12)
| Matthew Dellavedova (11)
| Quicken Loans Arena19,022
| 13–46
|- style="background:#cfc
| 60
| February 23
| Memphis
| 
| Kevin Love (32)
| Kevin Love (12)
| Matthew Dellavedova (6)
| Quicken Loans Arena19,432
| 14–46
|- style="background:#fcc
| 61
| February 25
| Portland
| 
| Cedi Osman (27)
| Kevin Love (12)
| Dellavedova, Nance Jr. (5)
| Quicken Loans Arena19,432
| 14–47
|- style="background:#cfc
| 62
| February 28
| @ NY Knicks
| 
| Kevin Love (26)
| Kevin Love (8)
| Cedi Osman (5)
| Madison Square Garden17,573
| 15–47

|- style="background:#fcc
| 63
| March 2
| Detroit
| 
| Collin Sexton (16)
| Nwaba, Nance Jr. (5)
| Clarkson, Nance Jr. (3)
| Quicken Loans Arena19,432
| 15–48
|- style="background:#cfc
| 64
| March 3
| Orlando
| 
| Jordan Clarkson (18)
| Kevin Love (14)
| Larry Nance Jr. (4)
| Quicken Loans Arena19,432
| 16–48
|- style="background:#fcc
| 65
| March 6
| @ Brooklyn
| 
| Kevin Love (24)
| Kevin Love (16)
| Collin Sexton (5)
| Barclays Center14,177
| 16–49
|- style="background:#fcc
| 66
| March 8
| @ Miami
| 
| Collin Sexton (27)
| Ante Zizic (6)
| Knight, Osman, Sexton (6)
| AmericanAirlines Arena19,600
| 16–50
|- style="background:#cfc
| 67
| March 11
| Toronto
| 
| Collin Sexton (28)
| Kevin Love (18)
| Cedi Osman (7)
| Quicken Loans Arena19,432
| 17–50
|- style="background:#fcc
| 68
| March 12
| @ Philadelphia
| 
| Collin Sexton (26)
| David Nwaba (7)
| Osman, Stauskas (4)
| Wells Fargo Center20,420
| 17–51
|- style="background:#fcc
| 69
| March 14
| @ Orlando
| 
| Collin Sexton (23)
| Osman, Love, Zizic (8)
| Cedi Osman (4)
| Amway Center18,091
| 17–52
|- style="background:#fcc
| 70
| March 16
| @ Dallas
| 
| Collin Sexton (28)
| Kevin Love (12)
| Osman, Love, Sexton (4)
| American Airlines Center20,347
| 17–53
|- style="background:#cfc
| 71
| March 18
| Detroit
| 
| Collin Sexton (27)
| Marquese Chriss (10)
| Cedi Osman (6)
| Quicken Loans Arena18,465
| 18–53
|- style="background:#cfc
| 72
| March 20
| Milwaukee
| 
| Collin Sexton (25)
| Love, Zizic (10)
| Larry Nance Jr. (5)
| Quicken Loans Arena19,432
| 19–53
|- style="background:#fcc
| 73
| March 22
| L. A. Clippers
| 
| Kevin Love (22)
| Larry Nance Jr. (9)
| Osman, Knight (3)
| Quicken Loans Arena19,432
| 19–54
|- style="background:#fcc
| 74
| March 24
| @ Milwaukee
| 
| Kevin Love (20)
| Kevin Love (19)
| Larry Nance Jr. (6)
| Fiserv Forum17,930
| 19–55
|- style="background:#fcc
| 75
| March 26
| Boston
| 
| Collin Sexton (24)
| Kevin Love (11)
| Larry Nance Jr. (7)
| Quicken Loans Arena19,432
| 19–56
|- style="background:#fcc
| 76
| March 28
| @ San Antonio
| 
| Collin Sexton (24)
| Larry Nance Jr. (11)
| Larry Nance Jr. (4)
| AT&T Center18,756
| 19–57
|- style="background:#fcc
| 77
| March 30
| @ L. A. Clippers
| 
| Jordan Clarkson (26)
| Thompson, Nance Jr. (10)
| Thompson, Osman, Sexton (4)
| Staples Center16,439
| 19–58

|- style="background:#fcc
| 78
| April 1
| @ Phoenix
| 
| Collin Sexton (21)
| Larry Nance Jr. (12)
| Larry Nance Jr. (4)
| Talking Stick Resort Arena14,050
| 19–59
|- style="background:#fcc
| 79
| April 4
| @ Sacramento
| 
| Jordan Clarkson (22)
| Larry Nance Jr. (16)
| Ante Zizic (4)
| Golden 1 Center17,583
| 19–60
|- style="background:#fcc
| 80
| April 5
| @ Golden State
| 
| Collin Sexton (27)
| Larry Nance Jr. (14)
| Clarkson, Sexton (4)
| Oracle Arena19,596
| 19–61
|- style="background:#fcc
| 81
| April 7
| San Antonio
| 
| Knight, Sexton (16)
| Larry Nance Jr. (10)
| Larry Nance Jr. (5)
| Quicken Loans Arena19,432
| 19–62
|- style="background:#fcc
| 82
| April 9
| Charlotte
| 
| Collin Sexton (18)
| Larry Nance Jr. (12)
| Collin Sexton (10)
| Quicken Loans Arena19,432
| 19–63

Player statistics

|-
| align="left"|≠ || align="center"| SF
| 19 || 3 || 194 || 19 || 5 || 1 || 4 || 32
|-
| align="left"|≠ || align="center"| SF
| 27 || 4 || 439 || 98 || 13 || 7 || 8 || 114
|-
| align="left"|† || align="center"| SG
| 34 || 24 || 979 || 186 || 98 || 25 || 16 || 396
|-
| align="left"|≠ || align="center"| PF
| 27 || 2 || 395 || 114 || 16 || 15 || 7 || 153
|-
| align="left"| || align="center"| SG
| 81 || 0 || 2,214 || 270 || 196 || 57 || 13 || 1,364
|-
| align="left"|† || align="center"| PF
| 9 || 5 || 169 || 33 || 9 || 11 || 0 || 57
|-
| align="left"| || align="center"| PG
| 36 || 0 || 715 || 67 || 152 || 12 || 2 || 262
|-
| align="left"| || align="center"| C
| 36 || 6 || 341 || 52 || 20 || 6 || 5 || 129
|-
| align="left"|‡ || align="center"| PG
| 10 || 0 || 144 || 15 || 17 || 4 || 2 || 43
|-
| align="left"|† || align="center"| PG
| 13 || 13 || 344 || 27 || 36 || 12 || 1 || 140
|-
| align="left"|‡ || align="center"| SF
| 1 || 0 || 1 || 0 || 0 || 0 || 0 || 0
|-
| align="left"|† || align="center"| SG
| 45 || 45 || 1,234 || 112 || 92 || 38 || 5 || 547
|-
| align="left"|‡ || align="center"| SF
| 16 || 0 || 214 || 34 || 7 || 9 || 2 || 81
|-
| align="left"|≠ || align="center"| PG
| 27 || 26 || 618 || 50 || 62 || 19 || 2 || 230
|-
| align="left"|† || align="center"| PF
| 16 || 0 || 251 || 29 || 17 || 3 || 2 || 108
|-
| align="left"| || align="center"| PF
| 22 || 21 || 598 || 239 || 48 || 6 || 5 || 374
|-
| align="left"|‡ || align="center"| SG
| 3 || 0 || 53 || 3 || 2 || 2 || 0 || 5
|-
| align="left"| || align="center"| PF
| 67 || 30 || 1,795 || style=";"|552 || 214 || style=";"|100 || style=";"|40 || 627
|-
| align="left"| || align="center"| SG
| 51 || 14 || 984 || 163 || 54 || 36 || 17 || 334
|-
| align="left"| || align="center"| SF
| 76 || style=";"|75 || style=";"|2,444 || 357 || 195 || 60 || 11 || 991
|-
| align="left"|≠ || align="center"| PG
| 9 || 1 || 176 || 19 || 23 || 8 || 3 || 74
|-
| align="left"| || align="center"| PG
| style=";"|82 || 72 || style=";"|13.0|| 236 || style=";"|243 || 44 || 6 || style=";"|1,371
|-
| align="left"|‡ || align="center"| PG
| 1 || 0 || 2 || 0 || 0 || 0 || 0 || 0
|-
| align="left"| || align="center"| SG
| 11 || 4 || 222 || 18 || 21 || 11 || 3 || 74
|-
| align="left"|† || align="center"| SG
| 24 || 0 || 342 || 47 || 19 || 7 || 3 || 132
|-
| align="left"| || align="center"| C
| 43 || 40 || 1,198 || 438 || 86 || 28 || 16 || 470
|-
| align="left"| || align="center"| C
| 59 || 25 || 1,082 || 320 || 53 || 13 || 22 || 459
|}
After all games.
‡Waived during the season
†Traded during the season
≠Acquired during the season

Transactions

Trades

Free agency

Re-signed

Additions

Subtractions

References

Cleveland Cavaliers seasons
Cleveland Cavaliers
Cleveland Cavaliers
Cleveland Cavaliers